The Hush is the fifth album by Scottish rock band Texas. Released in May 1999, the album debuted at number one in the United Kingdom and spent a total of 43 weeks on the UK Albums Chart. It has been certified triple platinum by the British Phonographic Industry.

Three singles were taken from the album: "In Our Lifetime", "Summer Son" and "When We Are Together".

Background, music and release
The album was recorded mostly in singer Sharleen Spiteri's house and was produced by co-songwriter Johnny McElhone.

The band described "In Our Lifetime" as "Siouxsie's "Hong Kong Garden" remixed by Prince".  Andy Gill of The Independent wrote that "Day After Day" sounded like Diana Ross meeting Massive Attack and "Saint" as "Chrissie Hynde covering a Van Morrison song".

Released as the lead single of the album,  "In Our Lifetime" reached number 4 in the UK Singles Chart. The other singles, "Summer Son" and "When We Are Together" respectively peaked at number 5 and number 12 in the UK. The Hush has been certified triple platinum by the BPI for UK sales in excess of 900,000 copies. This makes it the band's second most successful studio album after their previous album, White on Blonde (1997), which had been certified 6× Platinum.

Critical reception

The Independent wrote a favourable review, describing the song "Summer Son" as "funk motorik with bells Spectorising majestically away". Reviewer Andy Gill stated; "It's almost as if they've set out to make [...] a post-modern pop that sums up the entire history of this most varied of 20th-century media. The miracle is that they've just about pulled it off". In a 4 out of 5 star review, Q magazine said; "Production is paramount to The Hush [...], but for all the handsome noise, it's Spiteri's -widening vocal palette that gives the songs personality. "Move In" is built upon the muscular funk framework of, say, [ Grace Jones 's] "Pull Up to the Bumper", but elevated by a light, hipswaying vocal. In case anyone thinks "When We Are Together" is standard Motown confection, Texas strip it back to Spiteri and a piano in the middle just to prove how strong it is. For "Day After Day", she's Dusty Springfield."  Reviewer Andrew Collins concluded: this is "rare pop music that possesses both a collective personality and accumulated wisdom."

Pitchfork wrote: "Summer Son" bounces along like two-toned buttocks frolicking under a silk skirt, while the title track slowjams erotically like Spiteri rubbing down her body with her eyes closed, lips blooming to reveal marble teeth and a sentient tongue. Well, no. Really, there's more to this "music" than the singer's looks. Really. Stop looking at that. She's out of our league. Give me that back. I want the artwork!

Track listing

Personnel
Texas
Sharleen Spiteri
Johnny McElhone
Ally McErlaine
Eddie Campbell
Technical
Lee Swillingham, Stuart Spalding – art direction, design
Andy Dockerty, Davie Robertson, Derek Paterson, Fast Eddie, Graham Cochrane, Stevie Marr – crew
Eddie Campbell, Johnny Mac, Kenny Macdonald, Richard Hynd, Sharleen Spiteri – engineer
Mark "Spike" Stent – mixing
Luis Sanchis – photography
Johnny Mac – production

Charts

Weekly charts

Year-end charts

Certifications

References 

1999 albums
Texas (band) albums
Mercury Records albums
Trip hop albums by Scottish artists
Downtempo albums